Roasted Right is the debut recording by the swing revival band Squirrel Nut Zippers, first released as a 7" in 1994, and subsequently re-released with an additional track as an EP in 1997. Unlike later music by the Zippers, Roasted Right features a more blues-based sound without brass or woodwinds. The tracks "Anything But Love" and "Wash Jones" are early versions of songs later re-recorded for full-length albums.

Track listing
7" Vinyl 1994 (MRG057):
"Little Mother-in-Law" (Whalen/Mathus) — 2:36
"(You Are My) Radio" (Whalen/Mathus) — 2:08
"Anything But Love" (Raleigh) — 2:45

CD 1997 EP (MRG 057 CD):
"Little Mother-in-Law" (Whalen/Mathus) — 2:36
"(You Are My) Radio" (Whalen/Mathus) — 2:08
"Anything But Love" (Raleigh) — 2:45
"Wash Jones" (Mathus) — 2:46

Personnel
 Jimbo Mathus – guitar, slide guitar, lead vocals
 Katharine Whalen – banjo, ukulele, lead vocals
 John Kempannin – violin
 Don Raleigh – double bass
 Chris Phillips – contraption kit
 Ken Mosher – drums, vocals

References

1997 EPs
Squirrel Nut Zippers albums